Hang Tuah Mausoleum is a mausoleum located in Tanjung Kling, Malacca, Malaysia.

See also
 List of tourist attractions in Malacca
 Hang Tuah's Well

References

Central Melaka District
Mausoleums in Malacca